The Gate House  is an historic single-family home  located at 214 South Beach Road in Jupiter Island, Florida.  On November 21, 2001, it was added to the U.S. National Register of Historic Places. For several years, it was owned by Edsel Ford.

References

 Martin County listings at National Register of Historic Places

National Register of Historic Places in Martin County, Florida
Houses in Martin County, Florida